The Violet Keystone is the sixth and last book in Garth Nix's The Seventh Tower series, published in 2001 by Scholastic. Tal and Milla, along with some allies, are now face to face with the evil that plans to destroy their world. In this book, they travel one last time to Aenir, release their bonded Spiritshadows, and confront the mighty dragon Sharrakor.

The cover design and art are by Joan Moloney and Steve Rawlings respectively.

2001 novels
Children's fantasy novels
Novels by Garth Nix
2001 fantasy novels
2001 children's books
Australian children's novels